After the success of first two albums, Atif Aslam released his third solo album Meri Kahani in 2008. This album was produced by Sarmad Abdul Ghafoor.

Performance 
The entire album had a darker theme. Album's song "Rabba Sacheya" is synonymous with Faiz Ahmad Faiz's poem. The song revolves around the corruption in society and poor man's struggle to survive. The album was promoted by using the song "Meri Kahani". This song is about nostalgia, old memories and childhood. The Punjabi song "Maye ni" depicts the emotion like a folk song. "Jog" is a song about having lost everything that was precious to one.Piano is used in the song "Mann Hota Hai" and it is a simple composition.

Track listing 
The album was written by Atif Aslam and Shahzad Aslam. It was composed by Atif Aslam,Sheraz Siddiq, Sarmad Abdul Ghafoor, Mahmood Rahman, Sameer Shami and Farhad Humayun.

Awards and nominations

References 

Atif Aslam albums
2008 albums
Urdu-language albums